Autódromo Jorge Ángel Pena is a  motorsports circuit located in Mendoza, Argentina. It has hosted events in the TC2000 and Formula Renault series.

Lap records 

The official race lap records at the Autódromo Jorge Ángel Pena are listed as:

References

Motorsport venues in Mendoza Province